Below is the list of populated places in Gaziantep Province, Turkey by district.  The first two districts, Şahinbey and Şehitkamil, are parts of Gaziantep Province. The first place in each list is the administrative center of the district.

Şahinbey

	Şahinbey
	Akbayır, Şahinbey
	Akyazı, Şahinbey
	Almalı, Şahinbey
	Bekişli, Şahinbey
	Belenköy, Şahinbey
	Beşkuyu, Şahinbey
	Bozca, Şahinbey
	Cevizli, Şahinbey
	Çapalı, Şahinbey
	Çevreli, Şahinbey
	Çimenli, Şahinbey
	Çöreklik, Şahinbey
	Çubukdiken, Şahinbey
	Doğanca, Şahinbey
	Dokur, Şahinbey
	Ekinli, Şahinbey
	Gerciğin, Şahinbey
	Gülpınar, Şahinbey
	Güllüce, Şahinbey
	Hacıarslan, Şahinbey
	Hacıköprü, Şahinbey
	Hacıköy, Şahinbey
	Kapçağız, Şahinbey
	Kavşak, Şahinbey
	Kayakent, Şahinbey
	Kazıklı, Şahinbey
	Killik, Şahinbey
	Kumruhamurkesen, Şahinbey
	Kuşçu, Şahinbey
	Külecik, Şahinbey
	Kürüm, Şahinbey
	Morcalı, Şahinbey
	Narlıca, Şahinbey
	Ortaklar, Şahinbey
	Ozanlı, Şahinbey
	Pancarlı, Şahinbey
	Sarıkaya, Şahinbey
	Sırasöğüt, Şahinbey
	Şahinbey Mülk, Şahinbey
	Tiyekli, Şahinbey
	Töreli, Şahinbey
	Türközü, Şahinbey
	Ufacık, Şahinbey
	Uğurtepe, Şahinbey
	Yamaçtepe, Şahinbey
	Yaycı, Şahinbey
	Yaylacık, Şahinbey
	Yeniköy, Şahinbey
	Yeşilköy, Şahinbey
	Yığmatepe, Şahinbey
	Yoğuntaş, Şahinbey
	Zeytinli, Şahinbey

Şehitkamil

	Şehitkamil
	Acaroba, Şehitkamil
	Ağaçlıboyno, Şehitkamil
	Akçaburç, Şehitkamil
	Akçagöze, Şehitkamil
	Atalar, Şehitkamil
	Bağbaşı, Şehitkamil
	Battal, Şehitkamil
	Bayatlı, Şehitkamil
	Bedirköy, Şehitkamil
	Beyreli, Şehitkamil
	Bozobası, Şehitkamil
	Çağkuyu, Şehitkamil
	Cerityeniyapan, Şehitkamil
	Durnalık, Şehitkamil
	Dülük, Şehitkamil
	Dündarlı, Şehitkamil
	Eskişarkaya, Şehitkamil
	Günbulur, Şehitkamil
	Güngürge, Şehitkamil
	İncesu, Şehitkamil
	İskenderli, Şehitkamil
	Kabasakız, Şehitkamil
	Karacaören, Şehitkamil
	Karakesek, Şehitkamil
	Karayusuflu, Şehitkamil
	Karpuzkaya, Şehitkamil
	Serintepe, Şehitkamil
	Koçlu, Şehitkamil
	Köksalan, Şehitkamil
	Medegöz, Şehitkamil
	Öğümsöğüt, Şehitkamil
	Övündük, Şehitkamil
	Büyükpınar, Şehitkamil
	Sarılar, Şehitkamil
	Seymenli, Şehitkamil
	Sofalıcı, Şehitkamil
	Suboğazı, Şehitkamil
	Sülüklü, Şehitkamil
	Tekirsin, Şehitkamil
	Tokdemir, Şehitkamil
	Türkyurdu, Şehitkamil
	Uğruca, Şehitkamil
	Üçgöze, Şehitkamil
	Ülkerli, Şehitkamil
	Yalankoz, Şehitkamil
	Yamaçoba, Şehitkamil
	Yayıktaş, Şehitkamil
	Yenişarkaya, Şehitkamil
	Yeşilce, Şehitkamil
	Yığınlı, Şehitkamil

Araban

	Araban
	Akbudak, Araban
	Akkoç, Araban
	Altınpınar, Araban
	Aşağıkaravaiz, Araban
	Aşağıyufkalı, Araban
	Başpınar, Araban
	Beydili, Araban
	Çiftekoz, Araban
	Dağdancık, Araban
	Doğan, Araban
	Elif, Araban
	Erenbağ, Araban
	Emirhaydar, Araban
	Esentepe, Araban
	Eskialtıntaş, Araban
	Fakılı, Araban
	Fıstıklıdağ, Araban
	Gelinbuğday, Araban
	Gökçepayam, Araban
	Güzey, Araban
	Güllüce, Araban
	Gümüşpınar, Araban
	Hasanoğlu, Araban
	Hisar, Araban
	Karababa, Araban
	Karacaören, Araban
	Köklüce, Araban
	Körhacıobası, Araban
	Küçüklü, Araban
	Muratlı, Araban
	Nurettin, Araban
	Sarıkaya, Araban
	Sarıtepe, Araban
	Tarlabaşı, Araban
	Taşdeğirmen, Araban
	Yaylacık, Araban
	Yolveren, Araban
	Yukarıkaravaiz, Araban
	Yukarıyufkalı, Araban
	Ziyaret, Araban

İslahiye
 İslahiye	
 Ağabey, İslahiye	
 Ağalarobası, İslahiye	
 Akınyolu, İslahiye	
 Alaca, İslahiye	
 Altınüzüm, İslahiye	
 Arpalı, İslahiye	
 Şerikanlı, İslahiye	
 Bayraktepe, İslahiye	
 Boğaziçi, İslahiye	
 Burunsuzlar, İslahiye	
 Çerçili, İslahiye	
 Çınarlı, İslahiye	
 Çolaklar, İslahiye	
 Çubuk, İslahiye	
 Değirmencik, İslahiye	
 Elbistanhüyüğü, İslahiye	
 Esenler, İslahiye	
 Fevzipaşa, İslahiye	
 Güllühüyük, İslahiye	
 Güngören, İslahiye	
 Hanağzı, İslahiye	
 Hasanlök, İslahiye	
 İdilli, İslahiye	
 Kabaklar, İslahiye	
 Kalaycık, İslahiye	
 Kale, İslahiye	
 Karacaören, İslahiye	
 Karakaya, İslahiye	
 Karapınar, İslahiye	
 Karapolat, İslahiye	
 Kayabaşı, İslahiye	
 Kazıklı, İslahiye	
 Kırıkçalı, İslahiye	
 Koçcağız, İslahiye	
 Kozdere, İslahiye	
 Köklü, İslahiye	
 Kuşçumustafa, İslahiye	
 Ortaklı, İslahiye	
 Örtülü, İslahiye
 Sulumağara, İslahiye	
 Şahmaran, İslahiye	
 Tandır, İslahiye	
 Telli, İslahiye	
 Türkbahçe, İslahiye	
 Yağızlar, İslahiye	
 Yelliburun, İslahiye	
 Yeniceli, İslahiye	
 Yeniköy, İslahiye	
 Yesemek, İslahiye	
 Yeşilova, İslahiye	
 Yeşilyurt, İslahiye	
 Yolbaşı, İslahiye	
 Yukarıbilenler, İslahiye	
 Zincirli, İslahiye

Karkamış

	Karkamış		
	Akçaköy, Karkamış		
	Alaçalı, Karkamış		
	Alagöz, Karkamış		
	Arıkdere, Karkamış		
	Ayyıldız, Karkamış		
	Balaban, Karkamış		
	Beşkılıç, Karkamış		
	Çiftlik, Karkamış		
	Eceler, Karkamış		
	Elifoğlu, Karkamış		
	Erenyolu, Karkamış		
	Gürçay, Karkamış		
	Karacurun, Karkamış		
	Karanfil, Karkamış		
	Kelekli, Karkamış		
	Kepirler, Karkamış		
	Kıvırcık, Karkamış		
	Korkmazlar, Karkamış		
	Kuruyazı, Karkamış		
	Öncüler, Karkamış		
	Örmetaş, Karkamış		
	Savaş, Karkamış		
	Soylu, Karkamış		
	Subağı, Karkamış		
	Şenlik, Karkamış		
	Teketaşı, Karkamış		
	Tosunlu, Karkamış		
	Türkyurdu, Karkamış		
	Yarımca, Karkamış		
	Yaşar, Karkamış		
	Yazır, Karkamış		
	Yeşerti, Karkamış		
	Yolağzı, Karkamış		
	Yurtbağı, Karkamış		
	Zührecik, Karkamış

Nizip

	Nizip
   Adaklı, Nizip
	Akçakent, Nizip
	Akkuyu, Nizip
	Alahacı, Nizip
	Altındağ, Nizip
	Aşağıbayındır, Nizip
	Aşağıçardak, Nizip
	Bağlıca, Nizip
	Bahçeli, Nizip
	Ballı, Nizip
	Belkıs, Nizip
	Boyluca, Nizip
	Bozalioğlu, Nizip
	Çakmaktepe, Nizip
	Çanakçı, Nizip
	Çatalca, Nizip
	Dayıdağ, Nizip
	Dazhüyük, Nizip
	Doğrular, Nizip
	Duraklı, Nizip
	Dutlu, Nizip
	Düzbayır, Nizip
	Ekinci, Nizip
	Erenköy, Nizip
	Eskikonak, Nizip
	Gaziler, Nizip
	Gevence, Nizip
	Gökçeli, Nizip
	Güder, Nizip
	Gülkaya, Nizip
	Gümüşgün, Nizip
	Günaltı, Nizip
	Gürbaşak, Nizip
	Güzelköy, Nizip
	Hancağız, Nizip
	Hazımoğlu, Nizip
	İkizce, Nizip
	İntepe, Nizip
	Kaleköy, Nizip
	Kamışlı, Nizip
	Karaburç, Nizip
	Kayalar, Nizip
	Keklik, Nizip
	Kesiktaş, Nizip
	Kıraçgülü, Nizip
	Kıratlı, Nizip
	Kızılcakent, Nizip
	Kızılin, Nizip
	Kocatepe, Nizip
	Korucak, Nizip
	Köseler, Nizip
	Kumla, Nizip
	Kurucahüyük, Nizip
	Mağaracık, Nizip
	Mehmetobası, Nizip
	Mercanlı, Nizip
	Mihrap, Nizip
	Nahırtepe, Nizip
   Oğuzlar, Nizip
	Özyurt, Nizip
	Salkım, Nizip
	Samandöken, Nizip
	Samanlı, Nizip
	Saray, Nizip
	Sarıkoç, Nizip
	Sekili, Nizip
	Söğütlü, Nizip
	Suboyu, Nizip
	Tanır, Nizip
	Tatlıcak, Nizip
	Toydemir, Nizip
	Tuluktaş, Nizip
	Turlu, Nizip
	Turnalı, Nizip
	Uluyatır, Nizip
	Yağcılar, Nizip
	Yağmuralan, Nizip
	Yarımtepe, Nizip
	Yeniyapan, Nizip
	Yeniyazı, Nizip
	Yolçatı, Nizip
	Yukarıbayındır, Nizip
	Yukarıçardak, Nizip
	Dernek, Nizip
	Tosunlu, Nizip

Nurdağı

	Nurdağı		
	Altınova, Nurdağı	
	Ataköy, Nurdağı		
	Atmalı, Nurdağı		
	Bademli, Nurdağı		
	Balıkalan, Nurdağı		
	Başpınar, Nurdağı		
	Belpınar, Nurdağı		
	Çakmak, Nurdağı		
	Demirler, Nurdağı		
	Durmuşlar, Nurdağı		
	Emirler, Nurdağı		
	Gedikli, Nurdağı		
	Gökçedere, Nurdağı		
	Gözlühüyük, Nurdağı		
	Hamidiye, Nurdağı		
	İçerisu, Nurdağı		
	İkizkuyu, Nurdağı		
	İncegedik, Nurdağı		
	İncirli, Nurdağı		
	Karaburçlu, Nurdağı		
	Kartal, Nurdağı		
	Torunlar, Nurdağı		
	Kırışkal, Nurdağı		
	Kırkpınar, Nurdağı		
	Kömürler, Nurdağı		
	Kuzoluk, Nurdağı		
	Mesthüyük, Nurdağı		
	Naimler, Nurdağı		
	Nogaylar, Nurdağı		
	Olucak, Nurdağı		
	Sakçagözü	
   Sayburun, Nurdağı	
	Şatırhüyük, Nurdağı		
	Tandırlı, Nurdağı		
	Terken, Nurdağı			
	Tüllüce, Nurdağı
   Yaylacık, Nurdağı

Oğuzeli
	Oğuzeli	
	Acer, Oğuzeli	
	Akçamezra, Oğuzeli	
	Ambarcık, Oğuzeli	
	Arslanlı, Oğuzeli	
	Asmacık, Oğuzeli	
	Aşağı Güneyse, Oğuzeli	
	Aşağı Yeniyapan, Oğuzeli	
	Aydınkaya, Oğuzeli	
	Belören, Oğuzeli	
	Büyükkaracaören, Oğuzeli	
	Yeni Cumhuriyet, Oğuzeli	
	Çatalçam, Oğuzeli	
	Çatalsu, Oğuzeli	
	Çavuşbaşı, Oğuzeli	
	Çaybeyi, Oğuzeli	
	Demirkonak, Oğuzeli	
	Devehüyüğü, Oğuzeli	
	Dibecik, Oğuzeli	
	Dikmetaş, Oğuzeli	
	Doğanpınar, Oğuzeli	
	Dokuzyol, Oğuzeli	
	Duruköy, Oğuzeli	
	Dutluca, Oğuzeli	
	Ekinveren, Oğuzeli	
	Ermiş, Oğuzeli	
	Gebe, Oğuzeli	
	Gündoğan, Oğuzeli	
	Güveçli, Oğuzeli	
	Hatunlu, Oğuzeli	
	Hötoğlu, Oğuzeli	
	İkizkuyu, Oğuzeli	
	İnceyol, Oğuzeli	
	İnkılap, Oğuzeli	
	Kabacaağaç, Oğuzeli	
	Karaburun, Oğuzeli	
	Karadibek, Oğuzeli	
	Karaman, Oğuzeli	
	Karataş, Oğuzeli	
	Kaşyolu, Oğuzeli	
	Kavunluk, Oğuzeli	
	Kayacık, Oğuzeli	
	Kayalıpınar, Oğuzeli	
	Keçikuyusu, Oğuzeli	
	Keçili, Oğuzeli	
	Kersentaş, Oğuzeli	
	Kılavuz, Oğuzeli	
	Koçaklar, Oğuzeli	
	Kovanlı, Oğuzeli	
	Kuruçay, Oğuzeli	
	Şıh Küçükkaracaviran, Oğuzeli	
	Sergili, Oğuzeli	
	Sevindi, Oğuzeli	
	Sütlüce, Oğuzeli	
	Taşçanak, Oğuzeli	
	Taşlı, Oğuzeli	
	Tınazdere, Oğuzeli	
	Tüzel, Oğuzeli	
	Uğurova, Oğuzeli	
	Ulaşlı, Oğuzeli	
	Üçdamlar, Oğuzeli	
	Üçkubbe, Oğuzeli	
	Yakacık, Oğuzeli	
	Yazılı, Oğuzeli	
	Yeniköy, Oğuzeli	
	Yeşiltepe, Oğuzeli	
	Yukarıgüneyse, Oğuzeli

Yavuzeli
	Yavuzeli	
	Akbayır, Yavuzeli	
	Aşağıhöçüklü, Yavuzeli	
	Aşağıkayabaşı, Yavuzeli	
	Aşağıkekliktepe, Yavuzeli	
	Bağtepe, Yavuzeli	
	Bakırca, Yavuzeli	
	Ballık, Yavuzeli	
	Beğendik, Yavuzeli	
	Bülbül, Yavuzeli	
	Büyükkarakuyu, Yavuzeli	
	Çiltoprak, Yavuzeli	
	Çimenli, Yavuzeli	
	Değirmitaş, Yavuzeli	
	Düzce, Yavuzeli	
	Göçmez, Yavuzeli	
	Hacımallı, Yavuzeli	
	Havuz, Yavuzeli	
	Ilıcak, Yavuzeli	
	Karabey, Yavuzeli	
	Karahüseyinli, Yavuzeli	
	Kasaba, Yavuzeli	
	Keşrobası, Yavuzeli	
	Gülpınar, Yavuzeli	
	Kuzuyatağı, Yavuzeli	
	Küçükkarakuyu, Yavuzeli	
	Karahan, Yavuzeli	
	Örenli, Yavuzeli	
	Saraymağara, Yavuzeli	
	Sarıbuğday, Yavuzeli	
	Sarılar, Yavuzeli	
	Süleymanobası, Yavuzeli	
	Şenlikçe, Yavuzeli	
	Tokaçlı, Yavuzeli	
	Üçgöl, Yavuzeli	
	Yarımca, Yavuzeli	
	Yöreli, Yavuzeli	
	Yukarıkekliktepe, Yavuzeli	
	Yukarıyeniköy, Yavuzeli	
	Yeniyurt, Yavuzeli

Recent development

According to Law act no 6360, all Turkish provinces with a population more than 750 000, were renamed as metropolitan municipality. All districts in those provinces became second level municipalities and all villages in those districts  were renamed as a neighborhoods . Thus the villages listed above are officially neighborhoods of Gaziantep.

References

Gaziantep Province
List